Wasauksing First Nation (formerly named as Parry Island First Nation, meaning: "Place that shines brightly in the reflection of the sacred light") is an Ojibway, Odawa and Pottawatomi First Nation band government whose reserve is located near Parry Sound in Ontario, Canada.

Their reserve constitutes the Parry Island in Georgian Bay. The Wasauksing First Nation now occupies the entire island, although the ghost town of Depot Harbour on the island was historically a non-aboriginal settlement.

Community
The reserve is home to a community radio station, CHRZ-FM, the Indigenous magazine MUSKRAT, and discontinued Indigenous magazine Spirit.

Transportation
The reserve's main road crosses to the mainland via the Wasauksing Swing Bridge, connecting to Rose Point Road in Seguin Township south of Parry Sound. The road continues to Parry Sound itself, becoming Emily Street at the municipal boundary of Parry Sound and Seguin.

Notable members 

 Basil Johnston, historian and cultural essayist
 Francis Pegahmagabow, the most highly decorated Indigenous soldier in Canadian military history, 
 Waubgeshig Rice, writer and broadcaster

References

External links
Wasauksing First Nation
Wasauksing FN

First Nations governments in Ontario
Ojibwe governments
Ojibwe reserves in Ontario
Odawa reserves in Ontario
Potawatomi reserves in Ontario